The Ferrocarril Chihuahua al Pacífico (Chihuahua-Pacific Railway), also known as El Chepe from its reporting mark CHP, is a major rail line in northwest Mexico, linking Chihuahua City, to Los Mochis and its port, Topolobampo. It crosses the Sierra Madre Occidental, part of the range that in the United States is called the Rocky Mountains. There is no road covering the trajectory.

It runs , traversing the Copper Canyon, a rugged series of canyons that have led some to call this the most scenic railroad trip on the continent. It is both an important transportation system for locals and a draw for tourists.

Each one-way trip takes roughly 16 hours. The track also crosses over itself to gain elevation.

The headquarters were in turn located in Mexico City, Chihuahua and Los Mochis.

History
The goal was to build the shortest (1,600 miles) transcontinental railroad from Pacific coast to the Midwest.

The concept of the railroad was officially recognized in 1880, when the president of Mexico, General Manuel González, granted a rail concession to Albert Kinsey Owen of the Utopia Socialist Colony of New Harmony, Indiana, United States, who was seeking to develop a socialist colony in Mexico. The railroad was actually built by Arthur Stilwell as the Kansas City, Mexico and Orient Railway, starting about 1900. 

From 1910 to 1914, Mexico North Western Railway (sp. Ferrocarril del Noroeste) completed the Temosachic-Casas-Grandes line. Kansas City, Mexico and Orient Railway completed the Chihuahua-Ojinaga section. Enrique Creel's Chihuahua al Pacífico railroad completed the Chihuahua-Creel section.

In 1940, the Mexico acquired rights from Kansas City, Mexico and Orient Railway. In May 1952, Mexico took possession of a line operated by Mexican Northwestern Railway. In 1955, Mexico merged them as Ferrocarril Chihuahua al Pacifico, S.A. de C.V.

Financial difficulties caused by the cost of building a railroad through rugged terrain delayed the project, and the ChP was not completed until 1961.

The private rail franchise Ferromex took over the railroad from the Mexican government in 1998.

Schedule
In general, two different passenger trains run daily: Chepe Regional, a slower service with more stops for locals, with 15 official stops and more than 50 flag stops at which boardings or disembarkations can be made at passenger request, and the other a luxury, Chepe Express, direct service for tourists, which is faster and more expensive. First-class trains are composed of two to three cars, each holding 64 passengers. Second-class trains have three or four cars, each holding 68 passengers.

There is also regular cargo service running between Topolobampo and Chihuahua that might be further increased and extended so as to connect with the Texas Pacifico Transportation Railroad at the Ojinaga Presidio Crossing into the United States as a part of the La Entrada al Pacifico.

On its way from Los Mochis to Chihuahua it runs through El Fuerte, Temoris, Bahuichivo, Posada Barrancas, Divisadero, and Creel, among others.

In popular culture 
 The American funk group Vulfpeck named a song off their 2016 album (The Beautiful Game) "El Chepe" which features sounds of a train on a track.

Further reading

See also
 La Entrada al Pacífico
 List of Mexican railroads
 List of named passenger trains of Mexico

References

External links
 —El Chepe (chepe.mx) 
 —El Chepe (chepe.com.mx)
 MEXLIST : Mexican railroad discussion and study group
 How to Visit Copper Canyon by Train
 Ferrocarril Chihuahua al Pacifico  North America Railway Hall of Fame

Heritage railways in Mexico
Transportation in Chihuahua (state)
Transportation in Sinaloa
Named passenger trains of Mexico
Tourist attractions in Chihuahua (state)
Tourist attractions in Sinaloa
Railway companies established in 1880
1880 establishments in Mexico
Railway lines opened in 1900
Railway companies disestablished in 1990
Defunct railway companies of Mexico
Ferrocarriles Nacionales de México
Sierra Madre Occidental